Harris Mylonas is Associate Professor of Political Science and International Affairs at George Washington University and the editor-in-chief for Nationalities Papers, a peer-reviewed academic journal published by Cambridge University Press. He is the author of The Politics of Nation-Building: Making Co-Nationals, Refugees, and Minorities, which was awarded the Peter Katzenstein Book Prize in September 2013 and the 2014 European Studies Book Award by the Council for European Studies. He has co-edited Enemies Within: The Global Politics of Fifth Columns as well as The Microfoundations of Diaspora Politics and is currently working on another book project, Diaspora Management Logics. His documentary Searching for Andreas: Political Leadership in Times of Crisis (2018), which deals with the deep causes of the recent financial and political crisis in Greece, premiered at the 2018 Thessaloniki Documentary Festival and won two awards at the 2019 International Documentary Festival of Ierapetra.

Mylonas has contributed to the ideas of nationalism, nation-building, state-building, fifth column and multilateralism through different publications and articles. He has also contributed to the analysis of the Greek government-debt crisis. He is a member of the board of directors of the Association for the Study of Nationalities, an academic association dedicated to the understanding of ethnicity and nationalism with a geographic focus in Central, Eastern, and Southeastern Europe, and Eurasia. He also served as the chair of the Council for European Studies’ Historical Study of States and Regimes Research Network from 2019 to 2021.

Academic career
Mylonas completed his undergraduate degree at The University of Athens, received an M.A. in political science from the University of Chicago, and a Ph.D. in political science from Yale University. He joined the faculty of the Elliott School of International Affairs at the George Washington University in 2009. He also served as an Academy Scholar at the Harvard Academy for International and Area Studies at the Weatherhead Center for International Affairs in 2008–09 and 2011–12 academic years. Mylonas served as Associate Dean for Research in the Elliott School of International Affairs at George Washington University during 2017–18.

Selected publications
Books
 2022. Enemies Within: The Global Politics of Fifth Columns. New York: Cambridge University Press (co-edited with Scott Radnitz).
 2022. The Microfoundations of Diaspora Politics. Routledge (co-edited with Alexandra Délano Alonso). 
 2012. The Politics of Nation-Building: Making Co-Nationals, Refugees, and Minorities. New York: Cambridge University Press.
Review, by Karlo Basta, Canadian Journal of Political Science, Volume 49, Issue 01, March 2016, pp 173–174.
Review, by Jan Erk, Public Administration, Volume 92, Issue 2, June 2014, pp. 518–524.
Review, by Dmitry Gorenburg in Perspectives on Politics, Volume 12 / Issue 02 / June 2014, pp 512–513.
Review, by Neovi M. Karakatsanis Journal of Modern Greek Studies Volume 32, Number 1, May 2014 p. 210-12.
 Review, by Serhun Al in International Studies Review, Volume 16, Issue 2, June 2014, pp. 323–324.
Review, by Jan Jakub Muś in Nationalities Papers, Volume 42, Issue 5, 2014, pp. 905–906.
Review, by Jan Erk in Nations and Nationalism, Volume 20, Issue 3, July 2014, pp. 594–595.
Review, by Roberto Belloni in Südosteuropa, 61 (2013), 4, p. 595-597.
Review, by Georgi Derluguian in Modern Greek Studies Yearbook, Volume 28/29, 2012/2013, pp. 399–401.
Review by Olena Podolian in Europe-Asia Studies, Volume 66, No. 10, December 2014, pp. 1735–1737.
Review, by  A. Paczynska. CHOICE: Current Reviews for Academic Libraries,  Oct 2013 v51 i2 p350(1).
Articles
2022. "Pandemic Nationalism," Nationalities Papers, Vol. 50, Issue 1: 3-12 (with Ned Whalley).
2022. "Nation-Building and the Role of Identity in Civil Wars," Ethnopolitics, Vol. 21, Issue 1: 1-21 (with Kendrick Kuo).
2021. "Nationalism: What We Know and What We Still Need to Know" Annual Review of Political Science, Volume 24: 109-132. (with Maya Tudor).
2021. "Exchange on the quantitative measurement of ethnic and national identity" Nations and Nationalism, Volume 27, Issue 1: 22-40. (with Daniel Bochsler, Elliott Green, Erin Jenne, and Andreas Wimmer).
2020. "The Determinants of Successful Nation-building: Macro-sociological Political Modernization and Political Alliance Structures" Nationalities Papers.
2020. "Nation-Building," Oxford Bibliographies in International Relations.
2019."Nation‐building policies in the Balkans: an Ottoman or a manufactured legacy?," Nations and Nationalism, Volume 25, Issue 3: 866-887.
2019."The microfoundations of diaspora politics: unpacking the state and disaggregating the diaspora," Journal of Ethnic and Migration Studies, Volume 45, Issue 4: 473-491 (with Alexandra Délano Alonso) 
2019."Foreign policy priorities and ethnic return migration policies: group-level variation in Greece and Serbia," Journal of Ethnic and Migration Studies, Volume 45, Issue 4: 613-635 (with Marko Žilović)
2017. “Methodological Challenges in the Study of Stateless Nationalist Territorial Claims,” Territory, Politics, Governance, Volume 5, Issue 2: 145- 157 (with Nadav Shelef).
2016. “Threats to Territorial Integrity, National Mass Schooling, and Linguistic Commonality,” Comparative Political Studies, Volume 49, No. 11: 1446-1479 (with Keith Darden).
2015. “Methodological Problems in the Study of Nation-Building: Behaviorism and Historicist Solutions in Political Science,” Social Science Quarterly, Volume 96, Issue 3: 740–758.
2014. "Which Land is Our Land? Domestic Politics and Change in the Territorial Claims of Stateless Nationalist Movements,” Security Studies, Vol. 23, Issue 4, 754-786  (with Nadav Shelef).
2014. "Democratic Politics in Times of Austerity: The Limits of Forced Reform in Greece," Perspectives on Politics, Vol. 12, No. 2 (June): 435-443.
2014. “Interstate Relations, Perceptions, And Power Balance: Explaining China’s Policies Toward Ethnic Groups, 1949-1965,” Security Studies, Vol. 23, 148-181 (with Enze Han).
2013. “Ethnic Return Migration, Selective Incentives, and the Right to Freedom of Movement in Post-Cold War Greece”, in Willem Maas (ed.). Democratic Citizenship and the Free Movement of People  (Leiden/Boston: Martinus Nijhoff).
 2012. “The Promethean Dilemma: Third-Party State-building in Occupied Territories”, Ethnopolitics, Issue 1, March, pp. 85–93 (with Keith Darden).
 2011. "Is Greece a Failing Developed State?", in Botsiou, Konstantina E.; Klapsis, Antonis (eds.) The Konstantinos Karamanlis Institute for Democracy Yearbook 2011: The Global Economic Crisis and the Case of Greece. Springer.
 2010. “Assimilation and its Alternatives: Caveats in the Study of Nation-Building Policies", In  Rethinking Violence: States and Non-State Actors in Conflict, eds. Adria Lawrence and Erica Chenoweth. BCSIA Studies in International Security, MIT Press.
 2008. “When do Votes Count? Regime Type, Electoral Conduct, and Political Competition in Africa.” Comparative Political Studies, Vol. 41, No. 11, 1466-1491 (with Nasos Roussias).

References

External links
Harris Mylonas on Elliott School of International Affairs
Harris Mylonas on George Washington University

George Washington University faculty
National and Kapodistrian University of Athens alumni
University of Chicago alumni
Yale University alumni
1978 births
Living people
American political scientists
Greek political scientists
People from Thessaloniki